Souchez is a commune in the Pas-de-Calais department in the Hauts-de-France region of France.

Geography
The small river Souchez, a tributary of the Deûle, flows through the town.

Population

Places of interest
 The Basilica de Notre-Dame-de-Lorette, built in 1932, by the architect Louis Cordonnier. It overlooks Souchez, but is in fact located on the territory of the neighboring commune Ablain-Saint-Nazaire.
 The church of St.Nicolas, rebuilt, as was most of the village, after World War I.
 The French and Commonwealth War Graves Commission cemeteries.
 The war memorials.
 The museum and the Centre Européen de la Paix, all about the First World War
 The nearby Canadian National Vimy Memorial

See also
Communes of the Pas-de-Calais department

References

External links

 Official commune website 
 Zouave Valley CWGC cemetery
 Souchez Cabaret-Rouge CWGC cemetery
 Webpage about the monument dedicated to General Barbot 
 First World War Museum in Souchez

Communes of Pas-de-Calais
Artois